The arrondissement of Carpentras is an arrondissement of France in the Vaucluse department in the Provence-Alpes-Côte d'Azur region. It has 77 communes.

Composition

The communes of the arrondissement of Carpentras, and their INSEE codes, are:

 Althen-des-Paluds (84001)
 Aubignan (84004)
 Aurel (84005)
 Le Barroux (84008)
 Le Beaucet (84011)
 Beaumes-de-Venise (84012)
 Beaumont-du-Ventoux (84015)
 Bédoin (84017)
 Blauvac (84018)
 Bollène (84019)
 Brantes (84021)
 Buisson (84022)
 Caderousse (84027)
 Cairanne (84028)
 Camaret-sur-Aigues (84029)
 Caromb (84030)
 Carpentras (84031)
 Châteauneuf-du-Pape (84037)
 Crestet (84040)
 Crillon-le-Brave (84041)
 Entrechaux (84044)
 Faucon (84045)
 Flassan (84046)
 Gigondas (84049)
 Grillon (84053)
 Jonquières (84056)
 Lafare (84059)
 Lagarde-Paréol (84061)
 Lamotte-du-Rhône (84063)
 Lapalud (84064)
 Loriol-du-Comtat (84067)
 Malaucène (84069)
 Malemort-du-Comtat (84070)
 Mazan (84072)
 Méthamis (84075)
 Modène (84077)
 Mondragon (84078)
 Monieux (84079)
 Monteux (84080)
 Mormoiron (84082)
 Mornas (84083)
 Orange (84087)
 Pernes-les-Fontaines (84088)
 Piolenc (84091)
 Puyméras (84094)
 Rasteau (84096)
 Richerenches (84097)
 Roaix (84098)
 La Roque-Alric (84100)
 La Roque-sur-Pernes (84101)
 Sablet (84104)
 Saint-Christol (84107)
 Saint-Didier (84108)
 Sainte-Cécile-les-Vignes (84106)
 Saint-Hippolyte-le-Graveyron (84109)
 Saint-Léger-du-Ventoux (84110)
 Saint-Marcellin-lès-Vaison (84111)
 Saint-Pierre-de-Vassols (84115)
 Saint-Romain-en-Viennois (84116)
 Saint-Roman-de-Malegarde (84117)
 Saint-Trinit (84120)
 Sarrians (84122)
 Sault (84123)
 Savoillan (84125)
 Séguret (84126)
 Sérignan-du-Comtat (84127)
 Suzette (84130)
 Travaillan (84134)
 Uchaux (84135)
 Vacqueyras (84136)
 Vaison-la-Romaine (84137)
 Valréas (84138)
 Venasque (84143)
 Villedieu (84146)
 Villes-sur-Auzon (84148)
 Violès (84149)
 Visan (84150)

History

The arrondissement of Carpentras was created in 1800. At the January 2017 reorganisation of the arrondissements of Vaucluse, it received 21 communes from the arrondissement of Avignon, and it lost two communes to the arrondissement of Avignon.

As a result of the reorganisation of the cantons of France which came into effect in 2015, the borders of the cantons are no longer related to the borders of the arrondissements. The cantons of the arrondissement of Carpentras were, as of January 2015:

 Beaumes-de-Venise
 Carpentras-Nord
 Carpentras-Sud
 Malaucène
 Mormoiron
 Pernes-les-Fontaines
 Sault
 Vaison-la-Romaine

References

Carpentras